Giulio Meotti is an Italian journalist who writes on Middle Eastern and Jewish issues. He is a strong advocate of Israel, and is critical of both the Catholic Church and of Jews who are themselves critical of Israel, regarding them as abettors of anti-semitism.  He was subject to accusations of engaging in plagiarizing the work of other journalists, and since has worked for Il Foglio and Arutz Sheva.

Biography 
Meotti was born in Arezzo, the son of a goldsmith, who had an extensive clientele of polyglot Jews from whom Meotti is said to have absorbed their cosmopolitan outlook. He graduated in philosophy at the University of Florence with a Phd about George Steiner.

Criticism of Jewish critics of Israel
In his book Jews against Israel (2014) Meotti took to task a large  number of Jewish critics of Israel's behavior towards Palestinians, accusing them variously of intellectual treason, Jewish anti-Semitism, of being self-hating Jews as suffering from what in his view was a 'pathology' of Jewish anti-israelism or as being 'deranged' (squilibrati) Jew-haters'. The list of notable Jews he censures for their attitudes towards Israel and defense of human rights of Palestinians includes George Steiner, the philosopher Hannah Arendt, the Franco-German politician Daniel Cohn-Bendit, the former Chancellor of Austria Bruno Kreisky, Pulitzer prize-winning playwright and screenwriterTony Kushner, director Steven Spielberg, British historian Eric Hobsbawm,  the bioethics and moral philosopher Peter Singer, British politician Gerald Kaufman,  French journalist Jean Daniel, French essayist Dominique Vidal, the Argentinian civil rights activist Jacobo Timerman, rabbi Arnold Wolf philosopher Edgar Morin, the United Nations special rapporteur for Palestinian rights Richard A. Falk, the American historian Norman Finkelstein, English film, director   Mike Leigh, neuroscientist Steven Rose and his wife, the sociologist Hilary Rose, rabbi Michael Lerner, Nobel-prize winning dramatist  Harold Pinter, philosopher Judith Butler,  the historian Tony Judt,  the orientalist  scholar Maxime Rodinson, Italian novelist Natalia Ginzburg, the Italian Germanist Cesare Cases, the antifascist intellectual Emilio Sereni, the poet and literary critic Franco Fortini, the Italian journalist Gad Lerner, the Italian Yiddish playwright and musician Moni Ovadia, the Israeli biochemist and philosopher of Judaism Yeshayahu Leibowitz, the Israeli historian Shlomo Sand, the Israeli political geographer Oren Yiftachel, the Israeli political scientist  Neve Gordon, the Israeli journalist Amira Hass  Israeli historian Moshe Zimmermann, the Israeli historian Ilan Pappé, the Israeli conflict theorist Lev Grinberg, the Israeli historians  Tom Segev and  Idith Zertal, the Argentinian musician and comic Danny Rabinovitch, the Israeli novelists  Amos Oz,  David Grossman and Abraham Yehoshua, the cosmopolitan conductor Daniel Barenboim, and the diplomat Martin Indyk, and survivors of the Holocaust such as Warsaw ghetto survivor Marek Edelman, Marion Kozak (the mother of David Miliband and Ed Miliband), the sociologist Zygmunt Bauman, resistance leader Stéphane Hessel, the Israeli political scientist Zeev Sternhell, the French historian Pierre Vidal-Naquet, the writer Primo Levi  and the writer Isaac Deutscher.

Meotti's polemic against Jewish writers, thinkers, and cultural figures critical of Israeli actions was described as 'vitriolic' by reviewer  Stefano Caviglia writing for Panorama. Caviglia suggested that the real weakness of Jews who are overly critical of Israel lies in a putative inability to resist  ‘external pressure’, in what he considers  a ‘need to be accepted and considered politically correct by their readers or friends (Jews and non-Jews) of the same political leaning.' At the same time, he added, one should  remember that the Jews have an enduring tendency for controversies, as summed up in the age old adage:’Two Jews, three opinions.’

Work
Since 2003, Meotti has written for the Italian daily newspaper Il Foglio, where he is the Cultural Editor. He has in the past written articles for the rightwing think tank Gatestone Institute, The Wall Street Journal,  Commentary, National Review, the West Bank settler newspaper Arutz Sheva, Jerusalem Post, Fox News, Jüdische Allgemeine, Yedioth Ahronoth and FrontPage Magazine.

His book A New Shoah: The Untold Story of Israel's Victims of Terrorism, which was translated in English and Norwegian, was described by Israeli President Reuven Rivlin as "a valuable publication that presents a comprehensive picture of the many acts of terrorism against Israeli citizens."

Charges of plagiarism
In mid 2012, Meotti was accused by Marc Tracy in  Tablet of being a 'serial plagiarist' for lifting, unacknowledged, material written by other journalists. The accusation was also endorsed by Max Blumenthal who provided several other examples of apparent copyright violations. When this documentation demonstrated that Meotti had a practice of copying other journalists emerged, not only Ynet  but also Commentary magazine’s John Podhoretz severed their relationship with him for having engaged in journalistic theft. In self-defense, Meotti stated that if he indeed quoted without crediting his sources it was just carelessness, but claimed the accusations were actually a form of demonization of himself, whom he described as one of "the last and few pro-Israel journalists in Europe," part of an ad hominem campaign infused with envy which had been ongoing for some years. According to Blumenthal, Meotti considered the accusations as forms of incitement that put his life at risk.

Political views 
Meotti describes himself as a liberal conservative.

Private life 
Meotti is married and has two children. He resides in Rome.

Bibliography 
 Il processo della scimmia. La guerra dell'evoluzione e le profezie di un vecchio biochimico, Lindau, 2006, 
 Non smetteremo di danzare. Le storie mai raccontate dei martiri d'Israele (A New Shoah: The Untold Story of Israel's Victims of Terrorism), Lindau, 2009, 
 Ebrei contro Israele, Belforte Salomone, 2014, 
 Muoia Israele. La brava gente che odia gli ebrei, Rubbettino, 2015, 
 Hanno ucciso «Charlie Hebdo». Il terrorismo e la resa dell'Occidente: la libertà di espressione è finita, Lindau, 2015, 
 La fine dell'Europa, Cantagalli, 2016, 
 Il suicidio della cultura occidentale: Così l'Islam radicale sta vincendo, Lindau, 2018,

References

Living people
People from Arezzo
Italian male writers
21st-century Italian journalists
Italian male journalists
Italian political writers
University of Florence alumni
Critics of Islam
Critics of multiculturalism
Year of birth missing (living people)
Italian Zionists